Linda Armstrong may refer to:

 Linda Armstrong (actress), English actress
 Linda Armstrong (artist) (born c.1950), American artist